Madeline Lancaster is an American developmental biologist studying neurological development and diseases of the brain. Lancaster is a group leader at the Medical Research Council (MRC) Laboratory of Molecular Biology in Cambridge, UK.

Education 
Lancaster was an undergraduate student at Occidental College in Los Angeles from 2000-2004 where she studied biochemistry. She then went on to complete a PhD with Joseph Gleeson at the University of California, San Diego in 2010.

Career and research 
Lancaster conducted her post-doctoral work in the lab of Jürgen Knoblich at the Institute of Molecular Biotechnology in Vienna, Austria. This work was supported by fellowships from EMBO, the Helen Hay Whitney Foundation and Marie Sklodowska-Curie Actions. During this time Lancaster worked on developing the technology of cerebral organoids.

In 2015 Lancaster joined the Cell Biology division at the LMB, where she currently leads a research group studying the biological processes of human brain evolution. The lab uses the cerebral organoid system to study how genes impact on brain development in a range of species. Recent findings of the Lancaster lab have revealed a key difference in early neuroepithelial behavior in human compared with other apes that leads to an expansion in the founder stem cell pool and thus expansion of cerebral cortical neuron production. Her research also focuses on neurological disorders e.g. microencephaly and macroencephaly.

In addition to using organoids to uncover new biological insight, Lancaster has also improved and developed new organoid methods. These include cerebral organoids with improved reproducibility, long-term culture using a specialized air-liquid interface to enable functional maturation, the development of new ways of imaging organoids with electron cryo-tomography, and the establishment of organoids that produce cerebrospinal fluid (CSF) and model a selective brain barrier. These new methods were used to investigate infection by SARS-CoV-2, the virus causing COVID-19, revealing infection primarily of the CSF-producing tissue that led to barrier breakdown. Later post-mortem studies confirmed susceptibility of this tissue to the SARS-CoV-2 virus in human COVID-19 patients.

Awards and honours

Lancaster was awarded the Eppendorf Award for Young Investigators in 2014. The following year Lancaster gave a TED talk entitled 'Growing mini brains to discover what makes us human'. Lancaster was named a Cell Scientist to watch by the Journal of Cell Science in 2017. In 2019, Lancaster was named an EMBO Young Investigator  and in 2021 she received the ISSCR Dr. Susan Lim Award for Outstanding Young Investigator  and was named a Vallee Scholar. Lancaster was also named the 2022 Blavatnik Awards for Young Scientists in the UK Life Sciences Laureate  and was elected as an EMBO member in 2022.

References 

Year of birth missing (living people)
Living people
Occidental College alumni
University of California, San Diego alumni
Developmental biologists
American expatriate academics
American women biologists
American expatriates in England
21st-century American women